The Murray Cup is a rugby league competition on the border of Victoria and New South Wales. Initially the competition was established in 1998 as the Goulburn Murray Rugby League by the Country Rugby League and the Victorian Rugby League. The league was disbanded in 2009 before being re-established as the Murray Cup in 2015. As of 2022 there is a competition for both Senior Men's and Women's Tag football.

Current Clubs 
There are currently seven clubs affiliated with the Murray Cup competition.

Former Teams 
There are more than a dozen clubs which formerly competed in either the Murray Cup or its predecessor, the Goulburn Murray Rugby League.

Goulburn Murray Rugby League/Murray Cup Champions 
This is a list of the Goulburn Murray Rugby League 1st Grade competition champions and the runners-up for each seasons the competition existed.

References 

Rugby league in Victoria (Australia)
Rugby league competitions in Australia